The 2012 London Broncos season was the thirty-third in the club's history, their seventeenth season in the Super League and their first re-branded back to the London Broncos. Competing in Super League XVII, the club was coached by Rob Powell until midseason when he was replaced by Tony Rea. They finished in 12th place and reaching the Quarter Finals of the 2012 Challenge Cup.

They were captained by Craig Gower, finishing Super League's regular season 12th out of 14 teams, thus failing to reach the play-offs for the 7th consecutive year.

2012 Squad

Super League XVII table

References

External links
London Broncos - Rugby League Project

London Broncos seasons
London Broncos season
London Broncos season